Babcock is an unincorporated community in Miller County, in the U.S. state of Georgia.

History
An old variant name was "Pondtown". A post office called Babcock was established in 1902, and remained in operation until 1924. The present name is after three first settlers: brothers E. V., Fred R. and Oscar H. Babcock.  Babcock was incorporated by the Georgia General Assembly in 1901.  The town was officially dissolved in 1995.

References

Unincorporated communities in Miller County, Georgia
Unincorporated communities in Georgia (U.S. state)